The 2018–19 STOK Elite Division is the 4th season of the Cypriot fourth-level football league.

Format
Fourteen teams participated in the 2018–19 STOK Elite Division. All teams played against each other twice, once at their home and once away. The team with the most points at the end of the season crowned champions. The first three teams were promoted to the 2018–19 Cypriot Third Division and the last two teams were relegated to the regional leagues.

Point system
Teams received three points for a win, one point for a draw and zero points for a loss.

Changes from previous season
Teams promoted to 2018–19 Cypriot Third Division
 Kouris Erimis
 Omonia Psevda
 Amathus Ayiou Tychona

Teams relegated from 2017–18 Cypriot Third Division
 APEP FC
 Finikas Ayias Marinas Chrysochous
 Livadiakos/Salamina Livadion

Teams promoted from regional leagues
 AEK Korakou
 APONA Anageias
 ASPIS Pylas
 Kormakitis FC

Teams relegated to regional leagues
 Elpida Xylofagou
 Frenaros FC 2000
 Kornos FC 2013
 Poseidonas Giolou

Stadiums and locations

League standings

Results

Sources

See also
 STOK Elite Division
 2018–19 Cypriot First Division
 2018–19 Cypriot Second Division
 2018–19 Cypriot Third Division
 2018–19 Cypriot Cup for lower divisions

References

STOK Elite Division seasons
Cyprus
2018–19 in Cypriot football